Ohidur Rahman is a Bangladeshi Communist political leader, freedom fighter and writer. He was the former Member of Parliament of Naogaon-6.

Early life and education
Ohidur Rahman was born in 1943, into a Bengali Muslim family in Atrai, Naogaon, Rajshahi District, Bengal Presidency. He completed his education at the University of Rajshahi where he studied political science, and was associated with the Writers Students League.

Career
Prior to Bangladesh's independence, Ohidur Rahman had been a part of Abdul Hamid Khan Bhashani's National Awami Party and Purbo Banglar Communist Party. He was During the Bangladesh Liberation War of 1971, he set up resistances in 9 areas across Rajshahi. After the Independence of Bangladesh, he became the leader of the Communist Party of Bangladesh's Atrai branch and later the greater Rajshahi branch. Not long after, he was arrested after being injured in an armed brawl as part of a Naxalite uprising. He was released from prison in 1977.

During the 1986 Bangladeshi general elections, Ohidur Rahman successfully won a seat in the newly-created Naogaon-6 constituency as an independent candidate. He stood up again as a Communist Party candidate during the 1991 Bangladeshi general elections but lost to Bangladesh Nationalist Party politician Alamgir Kabir. He stood up as an Awami League candidate in the 1996 Bangladeshi general elections, but lost again to BNP politician Kabir.

Ohidur Rahman has written several works relating to the Bangladesh Liberation War and politics of Bangladesh. Two of his notable books are Mukti Shongrame Atrai (Atrai in the Liberation struggle) and Gontobbohīn Pothe (In a path with no destination).

References

Communist Party of Bangladesh politicians
Living people
3rd Jatiya Sangsad members
1943 births
People from Naogaon District
University of Rajshahi alumni
Communist writers
Awami League politicians